In probability theory and statistics Chow–Liu tree is an efficient method for constructing a second-order product approximation of a joint probability distribution, first described in a paper by . The goals of such a decomposition, as with such Bayesian networks in general, may be either data compression or inference.

The Chow–Liu representation
The Chow–Liu method describes a joint probability distribution  as a product of second-order conditional and marginal distributions. For example, the six-dimensional distribution  might be approximated as

where each new term in the product introduces just one new variable, and the product can be represented as a first-order dependency tree, as shown in the figure. The Chow–Liu algorithm (below) determines which conditional probabilities are to be used in the product approximation. In general, unless there are no third-order or higher-order interactions, the Chow–Liu approximation is indeed an approximation, and cannot capture the complete structure of the original distribution.  provides a modern analysis of the Chow–Liu tree as a Bayesian network.

The Chow–Liu algorithm
Chow and Liu show how to select second-order terms for the product approximation so that, among all such second-order approximations (first-order dependency trees), the constructed approximation  has the minimum Kullback–Leibler divergence to the actual distribution , and is thus the closest approximation in the classical information-theoretic sense. The Kullback–Leibler divergence between a second-order product approximation and the actual distribution is shown to be

Thus, if every branch (edge) on the tree is given a weight corresponding to the mutual information between the variables at its vertices, then the tree which provides the optimal second-order approximation to the target distribution is just the maximum-weight tree. The equation above also highlights the role of the dependencies in the approximation: When no dependencies exist, and the first term in the equation is absent, we have only an approximation based on first-order marginals, and the distance between the approximation and the true distribution is due to the redundancies that are not accounted for when the variables are treated as independent. As we specify second-order dependencies, we begin to capture some of that structure and reduce the distance between the two distributions.

Chow and Liu provide a simple algorithm for constructing the optimal tree; at each stage of the procedure the algorithm simply adds the maximum mutual information pair to the tree. See the original paper, for full details.

Chow and Wagner proved in a later paper  that the learning of the Chow–Liu tree is consistent given samples (or observations) drawn i.i.d. from a tree-structured distribution. In other words, the probability of learning an incorrect tree decays to zero as the number of samples tends to infinity. The main idea in the proof is the continuity of the mutual information in the pairwise marginal distribution. More recently, the exponential rate of convergence of the error probability was provided.

Variations on Chow–Liu trees
The obvious problem which occurs when the actual distribution is not in fact a second-order dependency tree can still in some cases be addressed by fusing or aggregating together densely connected subsets of variables to obtain a "large-node" Chow–Liu tree , or by extending the idea of greedy maximum branch weight selection to non-tree (multiple parent) structures . (Similar techniques of variable substitution and construction are common in the Bayes network literature, e.g., for dealing with loops. See .)

Generalizations of the Chow–Liu tree are the so-called t-cherry junction trees. It is proved that the t-cherry junction trees provide a better or at least as good approximation for a discrete multivariate probability distribution as the Chow–Liu tree gives.
For the third order t-cherry junction tree see , for the kth-order t-cherry junction tree see . The second order t-cherry junction tree is in fact the Chow–Liu tree.

See also
Bayesian network
Knowledge representation

Notes

References

.
.

.
.
.
.
.

Knowledge representation